Hansen Clarke (born March 2, 1957) is an American politician and former U.S. Congressman. Prior to his election to Congress, he had been a member of the Michigan House of Representatives from 1991 through 1992 and from 1999 through 2002, and represented the 1st district in the Michigan Senate from 2003 to 2011. Clarke was also the first U.S. Congressman of Bangladeshi descent.

Clarke entered Congress after defeating incumbent Carolyn Cheeks Kilpatrick in the 2010 Democratic primary for the 13th congressional district. In 2012, due to redistricting, fellow incumbent Gary Peters chose to run against Clarke in the 14th congressional district primary. Clarke finished second in the primary behind Peters, and left Congress in January 2013.

In April 2014, Clarke attempted a comeback and announced he would again run in the 14th District primary. The seat was to be vacated by Peters, who ran successfully for the U.S. Senate. Clarke was unsuccessful in his bid to regain the seat.

Early life, education, and early political career 
Clarke was born in Detroit, Michigan. His father was an immigrant from Beanibazar in Sylhet, British India (now Bangladesh), and his mother was African-American.  He grew up in the city's Lower East Side. Clarke's father died when he was eight years old and his mother worked as a crossing guard to support her family. Clarke is an alumnus of Cass Technical High School, and later graduated from The Governor's Academy, a Massachusetts boarding school.

Clarke attended Cornell University, graduating with a degree in fine arts. He is a member of Alpha Phi Alpha fraternity. While at Cornell, Clarke became interested in public service and electoral politics. He was elected to the student seat on the Cornell University Board of Trustees, defeating fellow student and future political commentator Ann Coulter in the process.  He earned a J.D. degree from Georgetown University Law Center in 1987.

Clarke worked on the County Executive's staff of Wayne County, during the administration of Edward H. McNamara, and then as chief of staff to U.S. Representative John Conyers.

Michigan legislature

Elections 
Clarke was elected to the Michigan House of Representatives in 1990, 1998, and 2000.  After his six years in the Michigan House, Hansen Clarke was elected to the Michigan Senate in 2002.  Senator Clarke was re-elected to his seat in the Senate in 2006. In 2010, Hansen Clarke was elected to represent the 13th District of Michigan in the United States House of Representatives.

Tenure 
Clarke served on the State Senate Appropriations committee, and later served on the Health Policy committee and Commerce and Tourism committee.

2005 mayoral campaign
Clarke ran unsuccessfully in the 2005 Detroit mayoral election.

U.S. House of Representatives

Elections 
2010

Clarke defeated seven-term incumbent U.S. Rep. Carolyn Cheeks Kilpatrick in the Democratic primary for Michigan's 13th District—the real contest in this heavily Democratic, black-majority district—in Aug. 3, 2010.

In the general election, Clarke easily defeated Republican John Hauler, and became the third American of South Asian descent elected to Congress.

2012

After Michigan lost a congressional district in redistricting, most of Clarke's district became the 14th District. It was significantly redrawn to take in large slices of nearby Oakland County.  Clarke's home was drawn into the 13th District, represented by fellow Democrat John Conyers, but Clarke opted to follow most of his constituents into the 14th.  Clarke faced fellow Congressman Gary Peters and Southfield mayor Brenda Lawrence in the primary.  Peters' 9th district had been eliminated in redistricting, and he chose to run in the 14th; he had represented much of the Oakland County portion of the district in both the state senate and in Congress.  Peters emerged as the winner, and defeated Republican John Hauler in November.

2014

In May 2013, Peters announced that he would not be running for re-election in 2014. He instead ran for the U.S. Senate seat being vacated by retiring Democrat Carl Levin. Clarke attempted to win his seat back, but was defeated in the primary by Brenda Lawrence.

Tenure 
Clarke championed initiatives to increase investment in the City of Detroit, which resulted in millions of dollars of federal assistance being awarded to the city and the region.  He won approval in Congress to increase funding to improve nutrition for low-income families, provide housing for homeless veterans, and better equip and staff local police, fire, and emergency medical providers to bolster homeland security.

Student Loan Forgiveness Act of 2012 (H.R. 4170)
Clarke led the effort in Congress to cut student loan debt for millions of Americans by authoring the Student Loan Forgiveness Act of 2012.  This bill inspired a national movement, including a petition in support of his legislation that received more than one million signatures that urged Congress to pass H.R. 4170.

Home foreclosures
Clarke also fought foreclosures to save family homes and neighborhoods.  He established himself as one of the nation's strongest advocates for struggling homeowners and distressed communities with the Save Our Neighborhoods Act, a bill that would allow many homeowners to stay in their homes by suspending the foreclosure process and reducing their mortgage principal.

Literacy
Clarke worked to reduce crime and restore hope by addressing the urgent crisis of illiteracy among African-American and Hispanic men.  He co-authored a bipartisan resolution initiating national action for literacy. Rep. Clarke also introduced the first federal legislation to "Ban the Box," which would prohibit unfair discrimination against job applicants with certain criminal backgrounds.

Clarke was a member of the Congressional Black Caucus, Congressional Asian Pacific American Caucus, and the Congressional Progressive Caucus.

Committee assignments 
 Committee on Homeland Security
 Subcommittee on Border and Maritime Security
 Subcommittee on Emergency Preparedness, Response, and Communications
 Committee on Science, Space and Technology
 Subcommittee on Space and Aeronautics
 Subcommittee on Research and Science Education

Electoral history

Personal life 
Clarke is married to Choi Palms-Cohen. They married in 2007, after meeting at the offices of the Institute of Continuing Legal Education (ICLE) in Ann Arbor, Michigan where she worked. They live on Detroit's east side where Clarke was born and raised. Clarke was raised as a Muslim but later converted to Catholicism.

See also 

 List of African-American United States representatives
 List of Asian Americans and Pacific Islands Americans in the United States Congress

References

External links 
 Hansen Clarke - Michigan Legislator Details
 Congressman Hansen Clarke official U.S. House website
 Hansen Clarke for Congress official campaign website

 Hansen Clarke at MichiganVotes.org
 Voting record: 1999–2000, 2001–2002, 2003–2006, 2007–2010
 Michigan Bureau of Elections – Hansen Clarke (State Senate) campaign finance reports and data
 Michigan Bureau of Elections – Hansen Clarke (State House) campaign finance reports and data
 Michigan Liberal – SD01
 
 

|-

|-

1957 births
21st-century American politicians
African-American members of the United States House of Representatives
African-American state legislators in Michigan
American former Muslims
American people of Bangladeshi descent
Bangladeshi Roman Catholics
Cass Technical High School alumni
Catholics from Michigan
Converts to Roman Catholicism from Islam
Cornell University College of Architecture, Art, and Planning alumni
Democratic Party members of the United States House of Representatives from Michigan
Georgetown University Law Center alumni
Living people
Democratic Party members of the Michigan House of Representatives
Asian-American members of the United States House of Representatives
Democratic Party Michigan state senators
Politicians from Detroit
People from Beanibazar Upazila
The Governor's Academy alumni
Asian-American people in Michigan politics
21st-century African-American politicians
20th-century African-American people
African-American Catholics